The Hotu and Kamarband Caves or Belt Caves are prehistoric archaeological sites in Iran.

Excavations took place led by Carleton S. Coon and were reported on between 1949 and 1957.

The site produced pottery shards, stone tools and material that could be radio-carbon dated. Twenty-two samples were dated and attributed to eight different cultures. The 2 earliest cultures, present at around 9,910 to 7,240 years BCE are assumed to be seal hunters and vole eaters. The bones of a dog have been cited as an example of exceptionally early animal domestication. Pre-Neolithic finds date to around 6,120 years BCE.

Kamarband cave is notable for three human skeletons discovered there, dating to approximately 9,000 years BCE. Other finds include flint blades, walrus and deer bones, giving valuable information about human development from the ice age in the Mazandaran area.

At Hotu Cave dwellers were identified as having Y-chromosome haplogroup J (xJ2a1b3, J2b2a1a1), with a more refined analysis putting it at J2a-PF5008*.

Literature 
 C. S. Coon, Cave Explorations in Iran 1949, Museum Monographs, The University Museum, University of Pennsylvania, Philadelphia, 1951.
 C. S. Coon, "Excavations in Huto Cave, Iran, 1951: A Preliminary Report", Proceedings of the American Philosophical Society; 96, 1952, pp. 231–69.
 C. S. Coon, The Seven Caves: Archaeological Explorations in the Middle East, New York, 1957.

References

External links
 Pbase.com: Photo gallery of Huto & Kamarband Caves

Caves of Iran
Landforms of Mazandaran Province
Archaeological sites in Iran
History of Mazandaran Province
Prehistoric Iran
9th-millennium BC establishments
Tourist attractions in Mazandaran Province
National works of Iran